Jimmy Snowden (September 21, 1933 – July 7, 2008), of Lauderdale County, Mississippi, was a conspirator and participant in the notorious murders of Chaney, Goodman, and Schwerner in Philadelphia, Mississippi in 1964. He was a member of the White Knights of the Ku Klux Klan and was sentenced in 1967 by federal district judge William Cox to three years for his role in the crime.
Jimmy Snowden had lived in Hickory, Mississippi. While reporting about the death of fellow trial defendant Olen Lovell Burrage on March 18, 2013, however, New York Times journalist Douglas Martin claimed that James T. Harris was the only surviving defendant who was tried for the murders, thus implying that Snowden had died by this point in time.

Crime 
Klansman James Jordan testified Snowden was among the men who gathered at Akin’s Mobile Homes in Meridian, Mississippi to meet Edgar Ray Killen, who had instructed Klansmen they had several civil rights workers in jail in Philadelphia and needed to hurry before they were released. Klansman Horace Doyle Barnette said Snowden traveled with him to Philadelphia, where Killen showed the jail where the trio were being held and instructed them on where they should wait behind an old warehouse. After the three civil rights workers were released from jail at 10 p.m., Klansmen pursued them in a high-speed chase. The trio pulled the station wagon over, and Cecil Price ordered them into his patrol car. Barnette identified Snowden as the one who then drove the station wagon to a remote road, where the trio were executed. Jordan identified Snowden as one of those present at the murder scene. Barnette said Snowden rode with him in his car to the dam, where the bodies were buried. Snowden was still with them at about 2 a.m. when the sheriff warned Klansmen not to talk. Barnette said he drove back to Meridian and dropped Snowden off at Akin’s Mobile Homes.

Conviction
Snowden was indicted on February 28, 1967. He was later convicted of violating the civil rights of James Chaney, Andrew Goodman and Michael Schwerner on October 20, 1967. On December 29, 1967, Judge William Harold Cox sentenced Snowden to three years in federal prison. However, only two of the three years were spent with Snowden behind bars: he was at FCI Texarkana until December 1971 and then transferred to FCI Lompoc until his release on 29 August, 1972. Snowden was reportedly roughed up in prison by black inmates.

Personal life 
Snowden was a truck driver. In fact, when he was released from prison, Snowden returned to trucking jobs in Meridian. Snowden resided in Hickory, Mississippi, during the last years of his life. Snowden was married to Mary Joyce Green (1936-2013). They had one son, Davie Snowden and two daughters, Vicky L Snowden and Brenda Faye Snowden. Davie Snowden (1963), (son) was arrested for shoplifting in July 2013. Thomas Davie Snowden (1991) (grandson) arrested October 2012 fugitive.

He was born to William D Snowden and Essie A Snowden. He had two sisters, Myrtle E Snowden and Mary H Snowden and two brothers William E Snowden and John C Snowden.

See also
 Bernard L. Akin
 Samuel Bowers
 Olen Lovell Burrage
 Edgar Ray Killen
 Cecil Price
 Lawrence A. Rainey
 Alton Wayne Roberts
 Herman Tucker
 Civil Rights Movement
United States v. Price

References

1933 births
2008 deaths
American Ku Klux Klan members
American prisoners and detainees
People from Lauderdale County, Mississippi
People from Hickory, Mississippi
People convicted of depriving others of their civil rights
Prisoners and detainees of the United States federal government